S.O.S. is a Swedish English language hit by Swedish singer Ola Svensson. It was written by Tony Nilsson and appears on Svensson's second studio album, Good Enough. It also appears on Good Enough - The Feelgood Edition. The hit credited to just Ola was a  number one hit on the Swedish Singles Chart on the chart dated 22 November 2007, staying a total of 16 weeks on the chart, including 6 weeks in the Top 5. The single was certified Gold by the IFPI, selling over 10 000 copies.

Charts

References

2007 singles
Number-one singles in Sweden
Ola Svensson songs
Songs written by Tony Nilsson
2007 songs